Gligvi — medieval ethnonym used in Georgian, Russian and Western European sources in the 16th-19th centuries. The ethnonym corresponds to the self-name of the Ingush — Ghalghaï.

History 
Gligvi are mentioned in Georgian sources as an ethnonym that existed during the reign of Mirian I in II century BC, as well as the ruler of Kakheti Kvirike III i.e. in XI century. Gligvi were also mentioned in a document of Vakhtang VI in 1729. Vakhushti Bagrationi wrote that the country of Dzurdzuketi (Durdzuketi) consists of Kisti, Dzurdzuki and Gligvi, of which the latter are located the more east of the three, i.e. north of Tusheti.

References

Bibliography 
 
 
 
 
 

History of Ingushetia
Ethnonyms
Nakh peoples
Ethnonyms of the Ingush